In the 1871 Iowa State Senate elections, Iowa voters elected state senators to serve in the fourteenth Iowa General Assembly. Elections were held in 34 of the state senate's 49 districts. State senators serve four-year terms in the Iowa State Senate.

The general election took place on October 10, 1871.

Following the previous election, Republicans had control of the Iowa Senate with 43 seats to Democrats' seven seats.

To claim control of the chamber from Republicans, the Democrats needed to net 19 Senate seats.

Republicans maintained control of the Iowa State Senate following the 1871 general election with the balance of power shifting to Republicans holding 42 seats and Democrats having eight seats (a net gain of 1 seat for Democrats).

Summary of Results 
 Note: The holdover Senators not up for re-election are not listed on this table.

Source:

Detailed Results
NOTE: The Iowa Official Register does not contain detailed vote totals for state senate elections in 1871.

See also
 Elections in Iowa

External links
District boundaries in the Iowa Senate were redrawn before the 1871 general election.
Iowa Senate Districts 1870-1871 map
Iowa Senate Districts 1872-1873 map

References

Iowa Senate
Iowa
Iowa Senate elections